Marc Adam Bodnick (born May 17, 1969) is an American entrepreneur and venture capitalist, best known as a co-founder of Elevation Partners.

Education
Bodnick earned a bachelor's degree in government at Harvard University and a master's degree in political science at Stanford University.

Employment
Bodnick is a founding principal of Silver Lake Partners. He also worked at Blackstone Group and Kroll.  In 2003, he co-founded Elevation Partners, along with Bono and a number of Silicon Valley investors and executives.  As Managing Director, he was credited with reversing the poor performance of the fund's first fund, with a $210 million investment in Facebook and a $100 million investment in Yelp, Inc. His sister-in-law, Sheryl Sandberg, is Chief Operating Officer of Facebook.

Quora
In early 2011, Bodnick was recruited to lead the business and community team at Quora, a question-and-answer website founded by Adam D'Angelo and Charlie Cheever, after becoming an early beta tester and contributor. In May 2016, he announced that he was leaving his position at Quora.

Telepath
After leaving Quora, Bodnick co-founded Telepath.com, an interest-based social network. Telepath is currently in private beta.

References

1969 births
American venture capitalists
Living people
Stanford University alumni
Harvard College alumni